The Padang Rengas railway station is a Malaysian train station located at and named after the town of Padang Rengas, Perak. This is the Southern Terminus for the  KTM Komuter Padang Rengas Line.

KTM ETS railway stations
Railway stations in Perak